Dominion is the eleventh studio album by power metal band HammerFall, released on 16 August 2019. The first single, "(We Make) Sweden Rock", was released on 3 May. The song is a tribute to Swedish hard rock and heavy metal bands. It is the second album to feature David Wallin on drums, and the first since his departure and subsequent rejoining in 2016.

Track listing

Personnel
Joacim Cans – vocals
Oscar Dronjak – guitars
Pontus Norgren – guitars
Fredrik Larsson – bass
David Wallin – drums

Guests 
Noora Louhimo (Battle Beast) – guest vocals on "Second to One" (single edition)

Charts

References

External links
 Official HammerFall website

2019 albums
HammerFall albums
Napalm Records albums